Emiline Rakotobe is a Malagasy politician.  She is a former member of the Senate of Madagascar for Alaotra Mangoro, and is a member of the Tiako I Madagasikara party.

References

Year of birth missing (living people)
Living people
Members of the Senate (Madagascar)
Tiako I Madagasikara politicians
21st-century Malagasy women politicians
21st-century Malagasy politicians
Malagasy women in politics